Wymington is a small village and civil parish in the borough of Bedford in northern Bedfordshire, England. It is located around a mile and a half south of Rushden, in the neighbouring county of Northamptonshire, and about 10 miles north-northwest of Bedford.

As of 2011, the parish of Wymington had a population of 876. The village is home to a 14th century parish church, a Weslyan chapel, a school, and a pub. One bus line stops in the village and provides service to Rushden and Bedford. A small brook runs through the village that drains into the River Nene about 3 miles north.

Throughout its history Wymington has been referred to by various names, including Wimmington, Winnington, Wimentone, Wimuntun, and Widmintun, among others. The name is possibly derived from Old English and refers to a 'tun' held by a person named Wigmund or Wimund, though other older sources indicate it could possibly be a reference to the site of an ancient, possibly Roman, battle. Wymington is home to numerous listed buildings in the village, including the Grade 1 listed parish church.

History

Prehistory and Roman settlement
Evidence exists of Neolithic and Bronze-age settlement of the Wymington area. Flint implements have been discovered in the area, and in the 1860s a hoard of 60 socketed axes was found on a farm near Wymington, possibly from an ancient bronze smith's stock.

Substantial evidence of Roman and Romano-Belgic settlement exists. A complex of enclosures visible today in the form of cropmarks and ditches as well as buried roof tiles and sherds about 700m south of the modern village probably dates from the 1st to 5th century. Additional evidence of Roman occupation has been discovered northwest of the village, where 3rd century pottery, a quern, building rubble, coins, belt buckles, and jewelry have been discovered.

Middle ages
Evidence of Saxon settlement was uncovered during an expansion of the Wymington school. Shards of early to middle Saxon pottery were discovered in ditches that had probably been dug in the 12th to 13th century. Wymington was recorded in the Domesday Book of 1086 as a parish within the Hundred of Willey, a part of the barony held by Alured de Lincoln. Four tenants were referenced in the survey, two of whom held manors.

Lords of the Wymington manors
The lordship of the Wymington manors was held by numerous individuals influential in 14th and 15th century English royal politics. By the 1350s, John Curteys had taken possession of one of the larger of two manors in the parish. Curteys, who was mayor of the wool staple of Calais, held considerable wealth. He provided funds to re-build the village church, completed in 1377, and made a loan to Richard II in the sum of £20 in 1379, an extremely substantial amount at the time. The church is the only remaining medieval building in the village. On Curteys's death in 1391, control of the manor passed to his wife, Albreda. 

The village's connection to Richard II and the crown continued when Sir Thomas Brounflete (also Brounflet or Bromflet), the king's Chief Butler and cupbearer, was granted lord of the manor at Wymington in 1397 on Albreda Curteys's death. Brounflete would go on to be the comptroller of the household of Henry IV. Sir Thomas's son, Henry, inherited the manor in 1430, and was sent as an ambassador of Henry VI to the Council of Basel in 1434. In 1448, Henry VI made him Lord Vesci (or Veysey). On Henry's death in January of 1468 lacking a male heir the manor and all of his other holdings in Bedfordshire and Buckingham was sold off by the executors of his estate, with the proceeds going to charity and to the church. 

In the late 1500s Henry Stanley, the 4th Earl of Derby and grandson of Henry VII, came into possession of the manors. In 1591, Henry, and later his son Ferdinando Stanley, 5th Earl of Derby, began to sell off large portions of Wymington to the manor in Podington.

Renaissance and modern era
By the early 17th century, Wymington was home to two manors, both referred to as Wymington Manor. Only one manor house remains, dating from 1612 on the north side of the village. The other manor house was probably on the opposite side of the village, on the south side of the High Street. By 1621, ownership of at least one of the manors, possibly both, was under one William Bletsoe. It remained in the Bletsoe family until it passed to a John Sawyer in 1708. In 1713, the manor was sold to Major General John Livesay, who had purchased nearby Hinwick House in 1706 and was a former governor of Jamaica.

Wymington has hosted at least one football club in its history, the Wymington Stars. The organization was founded before 1896, and fielded teams at least through 1931.

In the mid 18th century, Wymington was referenced as a "obscure and ruinous village," with 35 stone thatched houses and a population of 216. By 1870, the number of houses in Wymington had risen to 71.  In the late 19th century, the economy of Rushden shifted from reliance on agriculture to industry - specifically, the boot and shoe trade in nearby Northamptonshire. Also in 1870, a second church was built in the village. This church, a Wesleyan chapel, was built to house a congregation that had been meeting in homes since 1833.

In August, 1944 a damaged United States Army Air Forces B-17 "Miss Liberty Belle" based at nearby RAF Chelveston crashed while returning from a mission on the outskirts of the village. The aircraft, having sustained battle damage during its mission, was placed into a holding pattern above the village while other aircraft could land at the airfield. The aircraft lost all but one engine while waiting and began losing altitude, the crew narrowly avoided the church tower and school, colliding with a stand of with trees and landing in a field on the southern edge of the village. Eight villagers as well as a soldier of the Czech Army billeted nearby were able to pull all the crew members from the flaming wreckage, though only one survived.

In the mid-20th century, much of the old 16th to 18th century housing was demolished as part of a development project headed by the Rural Council. Council housing was constructed in the middle of the village along the High Street, and a housing estate was built to the south.

Geography
Wymington is situated in a far northwestern corner of Bedfordshire, with the parish boundary following the county line with Northamptonshire. While the village is surrounded by farms, the land was never considered suitable for market gardening as is common in the rest of northern Bedfordshire. The village lies at the intersection of three roads that lead north to Rushden, southwest to Podington, and a lane that connects with the A6 to the east.

Demography
{| border="0" align="center"
|

Landmarks

Nature Reserve
Sharnbrook Summit and Wymington Meadow nature reserve is located near Wymington to the south.

Grade I listed buildings
In the mid-14th century the only grade I listed building in the village, the Parish Church of St. Lawrence, was built. The church was constructed at the behest of John Curteys, a wealthy manor holder and mayor of the wool staple of Calais. It was built in the decorated style and is noted for its brasses and surviving late Medieval art, including a large doom painted over the chancel arch. Curteys died in 1391 and was buried in the church. The church is also home to the tomb of Sir Thomas Brounflet, cupbearer for Richard II.

Grade II listed buildings
Three buildings in Wymington are Grade II listed:
A pair of neighboring and connected coursed-limestone cottages with Welsh slate roofs, 5 and 7 Church Lane, that date from 1651.
The 17th century manor house on Manor Lane.
Poplars Farmhouse, which largely dates to the 1720s, but some parts date to the mid 17th century.

War memorials
A war memorial commemorating the men of the village killed in war resides in the church cemetery. It holds the names of the 24 men who died in the First World War, and the names of the 8 killed in the Second World War. Additionally, the village hall was dedicated as a memorial to those killed in the wars.

A memorial to the crew of the B-17 that crashed in the village in 1944 sits in a grove south of the village. The memorial consists of a plaque, iron bench with the symbol of the 8th Air Force, and a flag pole, and was dedicated on 7  May 2000. In August 2023 the village rededicated the memorial on the 75th anniversary of the crash. The rededication ceremony included representatives of the United States Air Force from nearby RAF Alconbury, the Royal British Legion, and military reenactors.

References

External links

Villages in Bedfordshire
Civil parishes in Bedfordshire
Borough of Bedford